Gordon Reid (born 4 March 1987) is a Scottish international Rugby union player. He plays as a loosehead prop. He now plays for Marr.

Rugby Union career

Amateur career

Reid played for Ayr.

In 2021 Reid joined Marr. He scored a try on his debut on 4 September 2021.

Professional career

Reid has played over 100 times for the Glasgow Warriors.

After 7 years at Glasgow Warriors Reid departed the club when his contract expired in the summer of 2017.

On 1 June 2017 it was announced he had signed for newly promoted London Irish in the English Premiership.

For the start of the 2019–20 season it was announced that Reid would join the Super 6 side, the Ayrshire Bulls.

On 29 November 2019 it was announced that in addition to playing for the Ayrshire Bulls, Reid would once again join Glasgow Warriors in a partnership contract between the Pro14 and Super 6 side.

On 11 March 2020 it was announced that Reid had signed for Northampton Saints. Saints' scrum coach Matt Ferguson said the capture of Reid was 'top of the shopping list'. He departed the club in June 2020 having not been able to play due to the COVID-19 pandemic. In November 2021 he joined Wasps RFC on a short-term contract.

International career

Reid was called into the Scotland squad for the first time during the 2012 end-of-year rugby union tests and made an appearance on the substitute's bench against Tonga on 24 November, however he did not make it onto the field for his international debut. Reid made his Scotland debut v USA on the 2014 tour, and was a member of the Scotland Squad at the 2015 Rugby World Cup. He scored his first try for Scotland in the Calcutta Cup game of the 2017 Six Nations Championship.

Outside of rugby

Reid made the headlines on 24 November 2019 when after investigating a burning smell – which he initially thought may have his tumble drier – he ran into a neighbour's house and saved a man from a burning building.

Reference List

External links 

 Gordon Reid ESPN Scrum Player Profile
 Gordon Reid itsrugby.co.uk Player Statistics

1987 births
Living people
Scottish rugby union players
London Irish players
Scotland international rugby union players
Rugby union props
Glasgow Warriors players
Rugby union players from Irvine, North Ayrshire
Scotland Club XV international rugby union players
Northampton Saints players
Ayr RFC players
Marr RFC players